Roman Petrovych Karpyuk (31 January 1964 – 9 January 2022) was a Ukrainian politician. A member of the Batkivshchyna party, he served as deputy chairman of the Volyn Oblast Council from 2014 to 2022. 

He died on 9 January 2022, at the age of 57.

References

1964 births
2022 deaths
All-Ukrainian Union "Fatherland" politicians
Lutsk Pedagogical Institute alumni
Merited Coaches of Ukraine
People from Volyn Oblast
Laureates of the Honorary Diploma of the Verkhovna Rada of Ukraine